Guest House Room Number:201 is a 2008 Maldivian mystery, thriller film directed by Amjad Ibrahim. Produced by Mohamed Shavin under V Stream Production, the film stars Mohamed Shavin, Khadheeja Ibrahim Didi, Aminath Ameela and Hussain Solah in pivotal roles.

Premise
A newly married couple, Viaam (Mohamed Shavin) and Lailaa (Khadheeja Ibrahim Didi) enter Maagiri Hotel and request for a room where the receptionist hands over them the key for the room number 201, much to the discomfort of Viaam, who has an unforgettable memory attached with the same room. Soon after, Lailaa starts experiencing paranormal activities in the room, which drives her into madness. She sees a man (Hussain Solah) wearing a yellow shirt, covered in blood who warns her about Viaam, calling him a murderer. Helpless, Viaam tells everything to Lailaa on how he met the guy and the reason for assault.

Cast 
 Mohamed Shavin as Viaam
 Khadheeja Ibrahim Didi as Lailaa
 Aminath Ameela as Aneesa
 Hussain Solah as receptionist

Soundtrack

References

Maldivian short films
2008 short films
2008 films
Films directed by Amjad Ibrahim